Pseudopostega albogaleriella is a moth of the family Opostegidae. It is widely distributed through eastern North America from Nova Scotia to central Florida and south-eastern Texas and in the south-western United States through areas of California and Arizona.

The length of the forewings varies from 3 to 5.3 mm and occasionally even to 6 mm. Adults are mostly white. Adults are encountered primarily during June and July into early August over the northern part of their range. Possibly two generations occur through the southern part of the United States, with adults appearing from February to June and from August to as late as October.

External links
A Revision of the New World Plant-Mining Moths of the Family Opostegidae (Lepidoptera: Nepticuloidea)

Opostegidae
Moths described in 1862